Agashe (IAST: Āgāśe) is a surname used by Chitpavan Brahmins of the Kaushik gotra in the Marathi-populated Deccan in India and by the Chitpavan Brahmin diaspora across the globe.

People
Ashutosh Agashe (born 1972), an Indian cricket player and businessman.
Chandrashekhar Agashe (1888 – 1956), founder of the Brihan Maharashtra Sugar Syndicate Ltd.
Dnyaneshwar Agashe (1942 – 2009), an Indian businessman, cricketer, cricket administrator and philanthropist.
Shripad Narayan Agashe (born 1939), an Indian botanist and palynologist.
Mandar Agashe (born 1969), an Indian music director and businessman.
Mohan Agashe (born 1947), an Indian theatre and film actor.
Panditrao Agashe (1935 – 1986), Indian businessman.

Places
Panditrao Agashe School, a private, co-educational day school in Pune, Maharashtra, India.
Chandrashekhar Agashe College of Physical Education, sports college in Pune.

See also

References

Bibliography

Indian surnames
Marathi-language surnames